The Offscreen Film Festival started in 2008, as an annual international non-competitive film festival organized in Brussels. The festival is intended to create an acquisition, media and exhibition platform for undistributed or rarely screened films and give audiences a chance to (re)discover repertory films, independent audio-visual creations and outsider cinema. New and sometimes unexpected associations between contemporary film and film history are explored by way of thematic programming modules.

Attracting more than 7000 visitors, the festival features cult films, documentaries and genre entries from around the world.

The festival's guests have included Jack Hill, Mark Hartley, Alex Cox, Jess Franco, Bruce Bickford, Phil Mulloy, Simon Rumley, Luigi Cozzi, Monte Hellman, Suzan Pitt, Ruggero Deodato, Umberto Lenzi, John Waters, Martha Colburn, Johannes Grenzfurthner, Peter Strickland, Radley Metzger, Robin Hardy, Martine Beswick, Bruno Forzani & Hélène Cattet.

Thematic and retrospective programs have included Freak Cinema (including a Tod Browning retrospective), a tribute to William Castle, Post-apocalyptic Film, Raro Italiano (Italian Genre cinema), Ozploitation, Pink & Violent (Japanese '70s exploitation cinema), a Spaghetti Western retrospective, Outer Space (rare science-fiction from behind the Iron Curtain), a tribute to the Shaw Brothers, Home Sweet Home (a program of Home Invasion & Haunted House films), Camp & Trash Cinema, 100 years Nikkatsu, British Cult Cinema, a Ken Russell retrospective, a tribute to Gisaburō Sugii and more.

References

External links 

Film festivals in Belgium
Fantasy and horror film festivals
Culture in Brussels